Fondazione Child (Foundation Child for Study and Research into Childhood and Adolescents) is a global-oriented foundation that promotes child-centered culture through close examination of the causes and treatments of physical and mental diseases. It was established in 1998 by the contribution of "SOS Il Telefono Azzurro Onlus- National Helpline for the Prevention of Child Abuse." The Founder and President of Foundation Child is Professor Ernesto Caffo, who is also the Founder and the President of SOS Il Telefono Azzurro Onlus.

Activity 
The Foundation Child supports research initiatives such as conferences and trainings in order to expand and promote research in the field of children and adolescent’s mental health.

The Foundation's main projects are the following:
 International Training Seminar
 ERICE (Empowerment and Resilience in Children Everywhere)
 Advocacy work: Speak Up for Kids
 Collaboration with other organizations

International Training Seminar 

The International Child and Adolescent Psychiatry Training Seminar is an annual training and panel discussion that brings together junior researchers and experts to exchange scientific knowledge in the field of child psychiatry. Since 2000, the Child and Adolescent Psychiatry Training Seminar has built up a renowned reputation in training researchers and triggering the scientific debate over the genetic and environmental aspects of childhood psychiatric disorders.

The aim of the Seminar is to provide insights not only on relevant elements of clinical practice and research, but also on those aspects which may complete the educational background of young specialists, such as basic principles of leadership, public speaking and communication.
Throughout the years, the Training Seminar has been endorsed by the World Psychiatric Association (WPA) and the Italian Society of Psychopathology (SOPSI) and gained attention both at national and international level. The last Seminars took place in May 2014 in Camposampiero and Bocca di Magra in 2013. The next Seminar will be in March 2016 near Venice.

Erice 

ERICE (Empowerment and Resilience in Children Everywhere) is devoted to the promotion of children’s rights and the protection of the right to health. ERICE group represents a think tank for the research and the intervention aimed at protecting children and adolescents affected by the devastating effects of war, out from the "logic of competition". The attention is all focused on children and adolescents who are living in conflict areas, promoting a preventive and supportive action that protects their mental health as a fundamental element to build a future of peace. 
The group operates primarily in the socio-medical, psychological, social and pedagogical fields, as well as any other form of assistance and relief to children who are living in disadvantaged and/or emergency conditions.
In September 2015, ERICE has been recognized the status of NGO (Onlus) based in Florence. This evolutionary step has been supported by ERICE's partner organizations and institutions: Foundation Child, International Centre for Missing and Exploited Children (ICMEC), UNICEF, the Fetzer Institute and Yale University.

Advocacy Work: Speak Up for Kids 
In May 2013, Foundation Child partnered with the Child Mind Institute spreading a campaign to raise awareness towards vulnerable children and adolescents and their community.

The purpose of the campaign was to encourage mental health professionals to sensitize and inform communities on the psychological difficulties that children experience throughout their development path whilst promoting the creation of an enabling environment to their growth.

Collaboration with other organisations 
In the last years, Foundation Child has engaged in several activities with third organisations in order to foster debate and research in some of the most pressing issues related to child and adolescent mental health.

In 2002, the Foundation supported the meeting Caring for Children and Adolescents with Mental Disorders organized by the World Health Organization (WHO). The purpose of the meeting was to set up directions for policy makers and experts in the field of mental health of children and adolescents.

In 2010, Foundation Child held a meeting in collaboration with the Italian Academy for Advanced Studies in America at Columbia University, called The future role of cutting-edge methods in the study and treatment of childhood disorders. The aim of the meeting was to examine the methods used in treatments of mental diseases, as well as of behavioral and emotional difficulties in children and adolescents. It was concluded that in order to be effective, it is important to support a child-centered culture. The meeting was sponsored by Columbia University and the Children First Foundation, under the patronage of Università degli Studi di Modena e Reggio Emilia.

Scientific Committee 
Foundation Child Scientific Committee oversees the foundation’s activities in order to make sure it works regularly to achieve its mission. The Scientific Board is made of the following:
 Prof. Ernesto Caffo is the founder and President of "Foundation Child" and "SOS. Il Telefono Azzurro Onlus". Chair Professor of Child and Adolescent Psychiatry at the University of Modena and Reggio Emilia, full-time Director of the Department of Pediatrics for the Hospital of University of Modena
 Prof. James F. Leckman - MD, Neison Harris Professor of Child Psychiatry, Psychiatry, Psychology and Pediatrics at Yale University. Director of Research for the Yale Child Study Center from 1983 to 2010.
 Prof. Fabio Macciardi – Professor of Molecular Psychiatry, Psychiatry & Human Behavior in the School of Medicine at the University of California, Irvine and Associate Professor at the University of Milan.
 Prof. Marco Battaglia – Associate Professor of Child & Adolescents Psychiatry (School of Psychology), Director of the department of Clinical Neuroscience Psychiatrist-in-Chief focused on Developmental Psychopathology at the Department of Neurosciences, University San Raffaele, Milan.
 Prof. Bennett Leventhal - M.D, Co-Chair of Scientific Research Council, Professor at the Department of Psychiatry; Deputy Director and Director of Training, Child & Adolescents Psychiatry, Langley Porter Psychiatric Institute, University of California San Francisco.
 Prof. Sergio Bernasconi – Chairman of the Dept. of Pediatrics at the University of Parma, Director of the Pediatric Clinic of the Hospital of the University of Parma and Professor at the Department of Clinical and Experimental Medicine of the University of Parma.
 Prof. Luciano Cavallo - Ordinary Professor of Pediatrics at University of Bari, Italy and Director of the Department of Biomedicine of developmental age.
 Prof. Gianni Bona - Ordinary Professor of Pediatrics at the University of Western Piedmont "A. Avogadro", Ordinary Member of the Endocrine Society, the European Society for Pediatric Endocrinology (ESPE), and the Italian Society of Pediatrics (SIP).
 Prof. Philippe Jeammet -  Emeritus Professor of Child and Adolescent Psychiatry, President of the Ecole des Parents School of parents and des Educateurs d'Ile de France and Director of the Department of Child and Adolescent Psychiatry at Institut Mutualiste Montsouris in Paris.

Board Members 
The Board of Foundation Child is composed of the following members:
 Prof. James Leckman - MD, Neison Harris Professor of Child Psychiatry, Psychiatry, Psychology and Pediatrics at Yale University.
 Prof. Gianni Bona - Ordinary Professor of Pediatrics at the University of Western Piedmont "A. Avogadro", Ordinary Member of the Endocrine Society, the European Society for Pediatric Endocrinology (ESPE), and the Italian Society of Pediatrics (SIP).
 Daniel, Baron Cardon de Lichtbuer – Former First Chairman of Child Focus (the Belgian Center for Missing and Sexually Exploited Children) and former President Founder of Missing Children Europe.
 Ms. Todini Luisa Todini - Politician, Italian Entrepreneur, and current President of Poste italiane.
 Dr. Giuseppe Ludergnani – Tax Advisor at Studio Luce. based in Modena.
 Dr. Ivano Spallanzani – President of Banco di Sardegna Spa, the Vice President and Board Member of the Executive Board of Banca Popolare dell’Emilia Romagna BPER

References

External links 
 

Non-profit organisations based in Italy